GAPÔ is a 1988 Tagalog novel written by award-winning Filipino author Lualhati Bautista.  Its complete title is GAPÔ at isang puting Pilipino, sa mundo ng mga Amerikanong kulay brown which means Gapô and one white Filipino, in a world of brown Americans" in translation. Gapô is an abbreviated form of the Philippine place name Olongapo.

See also
Pinaglahuan
Satanas sa Lupa

References

Novels by Lualhati Bautista
1988 novels
Political novels
Historical novels
Novels set in the Philippines
Olongapo